Ralph Spence (November 4, 1890 – November 21, 1949) was an American screenwriter and playwright. Born in Key West, Florida in 1890, he wrote for more than 120 films between 1912 and 1946. His play, The Gorilla, was produced on Broadway in 1925, and was the basis for several films. He also wrote material for a number of presentations of the Ziegfeld Follies and Earl Carroll's Vanities. Spence died in Woodland Hills, Los Angeles from a heart attack.

Broadway credits
Spence worked on several Broadway productions:

Ziegfeld Follies of 1921 - dialogue
Ziegfeld Follies of 1922 - book and lyrics
Ziegfeld Follies of 1923 (summer edition) - sketches
Earl Carroll's Vanities (1924) - book
The Gorilla (1925) - playwright
Earl Carroll's Vanities (1931) - book

Partial filmography

 The Yankee Way (1917)
 On the Jump (1918)
 The Oath (1921)
 Hickville to Broadway (1921)
 After Your Own Heart (1921)
 The Rough Diamond (1921)
A Ridin' Romeo (1921)
 For Big Stakes (1922)
 Do and Dare (1922)
 Sure Fire Flint (1922)
 Let's Go (1923)
 Six Cylinder Love (1923)
 In Fast Company (1924)
 On Time (1924)
 His Darker Self (1924)
 The Speed Spook (1924)
 Mademoiselle Modiste (1926)
 3 Bad Men (1926)
 Johnny Get Your Hair Cut (1927)
 Spring Fever (1927)
 The Gorilla (1927)
 Bringing Up Father (1928)
 The Patsy (1928)
 Excess Baggage (1928)
 Cracked Nuts (1931)
 Laugh and Get Rich (1931)
 Her Bodyguard (1933)
 Everybody Dance (1936)
 The Great Barrier (1937)
 King Solomon's Mines (1937)
 Sweet Devil (1938)
 The Gorilla (1939)
 The Flying Deuces (1939)
 Higher and Higher (1943)

References

External links
 
 
 

1890 births
1949 deaths
American male screenwriters
20th-century American male writers
20th-century American screenwriters